Adir Miller (born ) is an Israeli actor, screenwriter, and comedian. He is well known for his dry humor and his split second improvisation skills.

Early life
Miller was born in Holon, Israel, to Jewish parents who were Holocaust survivors.

He served as a commander in the Unit 8200 of the Israel Defense Forces's Intelligence Corps.

Career

Standup and television
Miller's professional career started in 1999, when he appeared in a stand-up comedy series called Domino, alongside Asi Cohen and Guri Alfi, among others. Afterwards he appeared in The Domino Effect and in Dudu Topaz's HaRishon BaBidur on the Israeli Channel 2.

In 2000, Miller started his own comedy show, named Adir Miller after himself. He simultaneously appeared as a comedian in Yair Lapid's talk show on Channel 2. In 2002, he began hosting his own humoristic talk show called The Adir Evening, which lasted 4 seasons. In 2005 he hosted the program Our Movie, and the satire show Culture Hall together with the Ma Kashur trio.

In 2008 Miller created and co-authored the sitcom Ramzor (lt. "traffic light") with screenwriter Ran Sarig. The show was broadcast on Israeli Channel 2. In 2010 the series won the Israeli Television Academy Award in the category of "Best Comedy Series" and was also the first Israeli television series to win an International Emmy Award in the Best Comedy category.

Theatre 
In 2006 Miller appeared in the musical HaLahaka as Paul Aviv (the role which Tuvia Tzafir played in the original film). In 2009 Miller appeared in the leading role in the play Mother-In-Law in the Habima Theatre.

Film 
In 2007 Miller played in the film The Secrets.In 2010 Miller played a lead role in Avi Nesher's film The Matchmaker. For this role Miller won an Ophir Award in 2010 in the best leading actor category. In 2013 Miller played a second lead role in Avi Nesher's film  "Plaot".

Personal life 
He is married to Israeli therapist Sheli Kaspi, and has three children. They reside in Givatayim, Israel.

References

External links

1974 births
Israeli stand-up comedians
Living people
Israeli entertainers
Israeli male comedians
Israeli people of Hungarian-Jewish descent
Israeli Ashkenazi Jews
Israeli male film actors
Israeli male stage actors
Israeli male musical theatre actors
21st-century Israeli male actors